Pyramid Peak may refer to several places:

United States 
Pyramid Peak (Alaska)
Pyramid Peak (California) (3,043 m)
Pyramid Peak (Fresno County, California) (3,895 m)
Pyramid Peak (Inyo County, California) (2,044 m)
Pyramid Peak (Colorado) (4,275 m)
Pyramid Peak (Custer County, Idaho) (3,544 m)
Pyramid Peak (Montana) (2,487 m), in Glacier National Park, Montana
Pyramid Peak (New Mexico) (1,827 m)
Pyramid Peak (Whatcom County, Washington) (2,189m)
Pyramid Mountain (Clallam County, Washington) (945 m)
Pyramid Peak (King County, Washington) (1,721 m)
Pyramid Peak (Pierce County, Washington) (2,114 m)

New Zealand 
Pyramid Peak (Southland) (2,295 m)
Pyramid Peak (Manawatu-Wanganui) (2,645 m)

Antarctic 
Pyramid Peak (South Georgia) (485 m)
Pyramid Peak (Victoria Land) (2,565 m)

See also 
Pyramid Mountain (disambiguation)
Pyramidal peak